Belinda Bauer (born 1962) is a British writer of crime novels. She grew up in England and South Africa, but later moved to Wales, where she worked as a court reporter in Cardiff; the country is often used as a setting in her work.

Bauer's debut novel, Blacklands, won the British Crime Writers' Association's Gold Dagger award for the best crime novel of 2010. Both Blacklands and her second novel Darkside (2011) are set around Exmoor in Somerset. Both have been translated into several languages.

Finders Keepers, Bauer's third novel, was set in the fictional location of Shipcott, also in Exmoor. The book was published in Britain on 5 January 2012, and in the United States on 28 February 2012.

In 2014, her book Rubbernecker, set in Cardiff and Brecon, won the Theakston's Old Peculier Crime Novel of the Year Award.

Bauer is a former journalist and screenwriter; she won the Carl Foreman BAFTA for her screenplay The Locker Room.

In July 2018 Bauer's novel, Snap, was longlisted for that year's Man Booker Prize.

Bibliography
 Blacklands (2009)
 Darkside (2011)
 Finders Keepers (2012)
 Rubbernecker (2013)
 The Facts of Life and Death (2014)
 The Shut Eye (2015)
 The Beautiful Dead (2016)
 Snap (2018)
 Exit (2021)

As Jack Bowman

High Rollers (2013)

References

1962 births
Living people
English crime writers
21st-century English novelists
English women novelists
Women mystery writers
21st-century English women writers